Jean Ribault High School is a public high school located in North Jacksonville, Florida. It is part of Duval County Public Schools.

Improvement
Ribault was one of 16 schools nationwide selected by the College Board for inclusion in the EXCELerator School Improvement Model program beginning the 2007-2008 school year. The project was funded by the Bill & Melinda Gates Foundation.

Athletics
The boys basketball team has won 4 State championships (1989, 1990, 1994, 1995).
3rd Most Tournament Games Played  163––Miami, 123 wins, 40 losses.  125––Malone, 87 wins, 38 losses.  105––Ribault (Jacksonville), 74 wins, 31 losses 
3rd Most Tournament Games Won  123––Miami, 163 games.  87––Malone, 125 games.  74––Ribault (Jacksonville), 105 games
The girls' basketball team has won 12 State championships (1988, 1993, 1994, 1999, 2000, 2001, 2002, 2003, 2013, 2014, 2016 and 2017), the highest total in the state. The team also has the highest state totals for consecutive championships (5), tournament appearances, consecutive appearances, tournament games played, and tournament games won. In 2016 the Lady Trojans won the 2016 National High School Invitational.
The baseball team won the State championship in 1968.
The boys' cross country team won the State championship in 1961.
The boys' track and field team won the State championship in 1979 and 1991.
The girls' track and field team won the State championship in 1976, 1977, 1990,  1992, and 1993.
The Trojan Football team has made 12 appearances in the FHSAA Playoffs and have won numerous District Titles. The Trojan football team also plays in the Northwest Classic Football Game against arch rival William M. Raines High School each year in November.

Notable alumni

 Chandra Cheesborough, Olympic champion sprinter in National Track and Field Hall of Fame
 Laveranues Coles, wide receiver, Washington Redskins, New York Jets
 Leon Gonzalez, wide receiver, Dallas Cowboys, Atlanta Falcons
 Rod Jackson, quarterback, Florida A&M University, the school's all-time leading passer who led the school to its first playoff appearance in 1985
 Kelvin Martin, wide receiver, Dallas Cowboys
 Travis L. Taylor, wide receiver, member of the Super Bowl champion Baltimore Ravens
 Chris Terry, offensive tackle, Kansas City Chiefs
 Howard Smothers, football player, selected by Philadelphia Eagles with 248th pick in 1995 NFL Draft
 Erica White, professional women's basketball player
 James F. Rinehart, Dean, College of Arts and Sciences, Troy University
 Longineu Parsons II, Trumpeter -  Associate Professor of Music at Florida A&M University
 Mike Campbell, musician, guitarist, Tom Petty and the Heartbreakers. Fleetwood Mac
 Butch Trucks, musician, drummer, The Allman Brothers Band
 Naz Worthen, football / track and field, Naz Worthen (All-American triple jumper) 60th pick in 1989 NFL draft by KC Chiefs out of NC State Univ.]]
 Jakob Johnson, football player for the New England Patriots

References

External links
Official site

Educational institutions established in 1957
High schools in Jacksonville, Florida
Duval County Public Schools
Public high schools in Florida
Magnet schools in Florida
1957 establishments in Florida
Northside, Jacksonville